Stack Overflow is a question and answer website for programmers. It is the flagship site of the Stack Exchange Network. It was created in 2008 by Jeff Atwood and Joel Spolsky. It features questions and answers on certain computer programming topics. It was created to be a more open alternative to earlier question and answer websites such as Experts-Exchange. Stack Overflow was sold to Prosus, a Netherlands-based consumer internet conglomerate, on 2 June 2021 for $1.8 billion.

The website serves as a platform for users to ask and answer questions, and, through membership and active participation, to vote questions and answers up or down similar to Reddit and edit questions and answers in a fashion similar to a wiki. Users of Stack Overflow can earn reputation points and "badges"; for example, a person is awarded 10 reputation points for receiving an "up" vote on a question or an answer to a question, and can receive badges for their valued contributions, which represents a gamification of the traditional Q&A website. Users unlock new privileges with an increase in reputation like the ability to vote, comment, and even edit other people's posts. 

 Stack Overflow has over 14 million registered users, and has received over 21 million questions and 31 million answers. The site and similar programming question and answer sites have globally mostly replaced programming books for day-to-day programming reference in the 2000s, and today are an important part of computer programming. Based on the type of tags assigned to questions, the top eight most discussed topics on the site are: JavaScript, Java, C#, PHP, Android, Python, jQuery, and HTML.

History 
The website was created by Jeff Atwood and Joel Spolsky in 2008. The name for the website was chosen by voting in April 2008 by readers of Coding Horror, Atwood's popular programming blog. On 31 July 2008, Jeff Atwood sent out invitations encouraging his subscribers to take part in the private beta of the new website, limiting its use to those willing to test out the new software.  On 15 September 2008 it was announced that the public beta version was in session and that the general public was now able to use it to seek assistance on programming related issues. The design of the Stack Overflow logo was decided by a voting process.

On 3 May 2010, it was announced that Stack Overflow had raised $6 million in venture capital from a group of investors led by Union Square Ventures.

In 2019, Stack Overflow named Prashanth Chandrasekar as its chief executive officer and Teresa Dietrich as its chief product officer.

In June 2021, Prosus, a Netherlands-based subsidiary of South African media company Naspers, announced a deal to acquire Stack Overflow for $1.8 billion.

Security breach 
In early May 2019, an update was deployed to Stack Overflow's development version. It contained a bug which allowed an attacker to grant themselves privileges in accessing the production version of the site. Stack Overflow published on their blog that approximately 184 public network users were affected by this breach, which "could have returned IP address, names, or emails".

Content 
Stack Overflow only accepts questions about programming that are tightly focused on a specific problem. Questions of a broader nature—or those inviting answers that are inherently a matter of opinion—are usually rejected by the site's users, and marked as closed. The sister site softwareengineering.stackexchange.com is intended to be a venue for broader queries, e.g. general questions about software development.

Closing questions is a main differentiation from other Q&A sites like Yahoo! Answers and a way to prevent low quality questions. The mechanism was overhauled in 2013; questions edited after being put "on hold" now appear in a review queue. Jeff Atwood stated in 2010 that duplicate questions are not seen as a problem but rather they constitute an advantage if such additional questions drive extra traffic to the site by multiplying relevant keyword hits in search engines.

All user-generated content is licensed under Creative Commons Attribute-ShareAlike license, version 2.5, 3.0, or 4.0 depending on the date the content was contributed.

Statistics 

A 2013 study has found that 75% of users only ask one question, 65% only answer one question, and only 8% of users answer more than 5 questions. To empower a wider group of users to ask questions and then answer, Stack Overflow created a mentorship program resulting in users having a 50% increase in score on average. As of 2011, 92% of the questions were answered, in a median time of 11 minutes. Since 2013, the Stack Exchange network software automatically deletes closed questions that meet certain criteria, including having no answers in a certain amount of time.

, 443,000 of the 1.3 million registered users had answered at least one question, and of those, approximately 6,000 (0.46% of the total user count) had earned a reputation score greater than 5000. Reputation can be gained fastest by answering questions related to tags with lower expertise density, doing so promptly (in particular being the first one to answer a question), being active during off-peak hours, and contributing to diverse areas.

In 2016, 1.5 million posts were deleted, of which about 8% were deleted by moderators.

Technology 
Stack Overflow is written in C# using the ASP.NET MVC (Model–View–Controller) framework, and Microsoft SQL Server for the database and the Dapper object-relational mapper used for data access. Unregistered users have access to most of the site's functionality, while users who sign in can gain access to more functionality, such as asking or answering a question, establishing a profile and being able to earn reputation to allow functionality like editing questions and answers without peer review or voting to close a question.

Reception 
Stack Overflow won the 2020 Webby People's Voice Award for Community in the category Web.

The site's culture has been criticized for being unfriendly, especially in the context of gender differences in participation and beginners learning computer science.

A study from the University of Maryland found that Android developers that used only Stack Overflow as their programming resource tended to write less secure code than those who used only the official Android developer documentation from Google, while developers using only the official Android documentation tended to write significantly less functional code than those who used only Stack Overflow.

See also 

 Askbot (free engine)
 List of Internet forums
 OSQA (Open Source Question and Answer)
 Rosetta Code (multi-lingual algorithms)

References

External links 
 

Computing websites
Gamification
Internet properties established in 2008
Question-and-answer websites
Software developer communities
Stack Exchange network
2021 mergers and acquisitions